Fort Pointe-aux-Trembles was a French fort built during the 17th century in New France.

History 

Fort Pointe-aux-Trembles was built around 1670 on the Island of Montreal in order to defend this part of the island which also included Ville-Marie.

During the first part of 1660, the religious order of Sulpicians colonized this part of the island opposite Ville-Marie. Due to a threatening situation with the Iroquois, a fort was erected to defend the colonization of the Island of Montreal and protect the banks along the  Saint Lawrence river.

With the construction of this fort, the parish of Pointe-aux-Trembles became the second parish of the island of Montreal. The palissade fort surrounded the small village on the eastern side of the island. The fort has a mill and a chapel as well.

In 1693, land titles were given to the inhabitants who later became part of the community of Vieux—Pointe-aux-Trembles.

Towards the beginning of the following century, the Chemin du Roy was traced, and it became the first carriage road to link Montreal to Quebec City.

In 1845, the municipality of Pointe-aux-Trembles was formed.

Today, a park extends on this historical part of the island, Park Fort-de-Pointe-aux-Trembles.

See also 

 Pointe-aux-Trembles
 List of French forts in North America

External links 

 Historique de la Pointe-aux-Trembles
 Circuit historique du vieux Pointe-aux-Trembles

1670 establishments in the French colonial empire
Buildings and structures in Montreal
Pointe-aux-Trembles
History museums in Quebec
Museums in Montreal
New France
Rivière-des-Prairies–Pointe-aux-Trembles